New City School is a non-sectarian, co-educational independent elementary school in St. Louis, Missouri. It was founded 1969 in the Central West End neighborhood. 

The New City student body is composed of 37% students of color. Its come from 48 different zip codes, and 40% of them receive need-based scholarships.

New City School has 40 full-time and five part-time faculty members,

History

1960's 
In 1966, the Barat Hall and City House schools in the Central West End neighborhood were closed. A number of parents became concerned about the gap left by their closing. 

In 1969, New City opened in the First Unitarian church in the neighborhood. The head of school was Jerry Glynn. The new school had six teachers and nearly 100 children. with classes from preschool to fourth grade.

1970's 
In the 1970's. New City School moved to the vacated Lutheran High School building. It was built in 1901 to house the Mary Institute.

In 1971, Charlie Rathbone became head of school, serving until 1972. Len Marks became head in 1974. During this period the school received full accreditation was received from the Independent Schools Association of the Central States (ISACS).

1980's 
In 1981, Tom Hoerr, a principal from University City, Missouri, became Head of School. In 1983, New City was named an A+ School by Instructor Magazine.

From 1987 to 1988, the school launched a $1,000,000 capital campaign is launched to renovate the building so that all three floors can hold classroom spaces. The faculty begins to pursue implementing multiple intelligences (MI) in 1988.

In 1989, New City School dispensed $93,901 in need-based scholarships to 18.9% of its students.

During the 1980's, the school held four multiple intelligence conferences. The faculty wrote two books,

 Celebrating Multiple Intelligences: Teaching for Success
 Succeeding with Multiple Intelligences: Teaching through the Personal Intelligences.

1990's 
In 1992, New City School launched a $1,200,000 capital campaign. The school acquired land to create a new playground, soccer field, parking lot and playing field. In 1993, the school created the Financial Aid Endowment Fund ($3,422,000 as of July 2013).

In 1998, New City School renovated the theater and renamed it Founders Hall. In 1999, $351,597 in need-based scholarships was distributed to 26.7% of the students.

2000's 
In 2001, News City School opened its Centennial Garden on the playground. In 2005, Howard Gardner, creator of multiple intelligences theory, visited the school to open the first Multiple Intelligences Library. In 2009, $749,873 in need-based scholarships was distributed to 34.9% of the students.

In 2009, the school installed a green roof over the dining hall. In 2010, Jossey-Bass publishes the faculty's book, Celebrating Every Learner. In 2015, Tom Hoerr retired. He was replaced in 2016 by Alexis Wright.

Faculty and staff 
New City School has 40 full-time and five part-time faculty members, including classroom teachers and specialists in science, library, Spanish, art, movement and music, performing arts, physical education and technology, in addition to a learning specialist and school counselor. 

New City School teachers have an average of 13 years teaching experience with an average of 11 years spent teaching at New City School. 50% of teachers have advanced teaching degrees. New City maintains a 9:1 student teacher ratio in its classrooms.

Performance Based Pay Plan

New City School uses a performance-based pay plan for teachers. Teachers are evaluated in five key areas:

 Knowledge of subject matter.
 Knowledge of child development and the learning process.
 Rapport and enthusiasm with students.
 Presentation skills.
 Professionalism and collegiality.

References

External links 
 Official Website of New City School

Elementary schools in St. Louis County, Missouri
Gifted education
Private schools in St. Louis
Private elementary schools in Missouri